Orgyia thyellina, the white-spotted tussock moth, is a species of moth of the subfamily Lymantriinae first described by Arthur Gardiner Butler in 1881. It is native to the Russian Far East, Japan, Korea, Taiwan, and China. It was discovered in Auckland, New Zealand, in 1996. Operation Ever Green was established that same year to eradicate the pest. By 1998, the species was eradicated. It is thought of as one of the most successful eradication programmes ever undertaken in an urban area.

The wingspan is 21–29 mm for males and 30–42 mm for females of the first two generations. The first two generations each year produce winged female moths. The last generation of females is flightless. Male adults are usually grey to black with one white spot on each wing. Females are generally creamy white with a dark spot on the wings.

The larvae mainly feed on Rosaceae species, including mulberry (Morus), Pyrus, Prunus avium, Prunus domestica and Malus. Other recorded food plants include Rosa, Prunus persica, Salix, Betula, Quercus, Acer negundo, Wisteria, Kennedia, Clianthus puniceus, and Citrus × paradisi. They are blackish and strongly setose (bristled), with a red line along each side and four tufts of pale hairs along the back. The male larvae have five instars while female larvae have six.

Gallery

References

Lymantriinae
Moths of Japan
Moths of New Zealand
Moths described in 1881